Country Air may refer to:
 Country Air (film), a 1933 Italian film
 "Country Air", a song by the Beach Boys on the album Wild Honey
Country Airs, album by Rick Wakeman